was a member of the Supreme Court of Japan. She joined on September 11, 2008.

Sakurai, a former bureaucrat of the Ministry of Labor, replaced Kazuko Yokoo, who resigned. She was the third woman to take a post in the Supreme Court of Japan.

References

Supreme Court of Japan justices
1947 births
Living people